Snežnica is a village and municipality in Kysucké Nové Mesto District in the Žilina Region of northern Slovakia.

History
In historical records the village was first mentioned in 1426.

Geography
The municipality lies at an altitude of 404 metres and covers an area of 5.511 km². It has a population of about 1022 people.

References

External links
  Snežnica local website (in Slovak)
  Photo Gallery
 http://www.statistics.sk/mosmis/eng/run.html DEAD LINK

Villages and municipalities in Kysucké Nové Mesto District